The Great Qing Legal Code (or Great Ching Legal Code), also known as the Qing Code (Ching Code) or, in Hong Kong law, as the Ta Tsing Leu Lee (大清律例), was the legal code of the Qing empire (1644–1912). The code was based on the Ming legal code, the Great Ming Code, which was kept largely intact. Compared to the Ming code which had no more than several hundred statutes and sub-statutes, the Qing code contained 1,907 statutes from over 30 times of revisions between 1644 and 1912. One of the first of these revisions was in 1660, completed by Wei Zhouzuo and Bahana.

The Qing code was the last legal code of imperial China. By the end of Qing dynasty, it had been the only legal code enforced in China for nearly 270 years. Even with the fall of imperial Qing in 1912, the Confucian philosophy of social control enshrined in the Qing code remain influential in the German-based system of the Republic of China, and later, the Soviet-based system of the People's Republic of China. Part of the Qing code were used in British Hong Kong until 1971.

The code was the end result of a complex legal culture and occupied the central position of the Qing legal system. It showed a high level of continuity with the Tang Legal Code which indicated that there was an active legal tradition at the highest level of Imperial Chinese bureaucracy that had existed for at least a thousand years.

Structure 
The Great Qing Code is made up of 436 articles divided into seven parts which are then further subdivided into chapters. The first part (Names and General Rules) is a General Part similar to the General Part of the BGB. The first part contains the general legal rules, principles and concepts that are applied to the rest of the Code. The other six parts are named after the Six Ministries of government and each part contains laws that are perceived as applicable to each ministry.

 First part (Names and General Rules), Articles 1 through 46 - includes but not limited to laws on the Five Punishments (art. 1) and the Ten Great Wrongs (art. 2)
 Second part (Laws relating to the Board of Personnel), Articles 47 through 74 - includes but not limited to laws on the System of Offices (ch. 1) and Official Rules for Carrying Public Administration (ch. 2) 
 Third part (Laws relating to the Board of Revenue), Articles 75 though 156 - includes but not limited to laws on Marriage (ch. 3 - 4; art. 101 - 107) and Taxes (ch.7; art. 141 - 148)
 Fourth part (Laws relating to the Board of Rites), Articles 157 through 182 - includes laws on Sacrifices (Ch. 1) and Rules of Demeanor (Ch. 2)
 Fifth part (Laws relating to the Board of War), Articles 183 through 253 - includes but not limited to laws on Guarding the Palace (ch. 1, art. 183 - 198) and Military Affairs (ch.2; art. 199 - 219)
 Sixth part (Laws relating to the Board of Punishments), Articles 254 to 423 - includes but not limited to laws on Homicide (ch. 8 - 10; art. 282 - 301)
 Seventh part (Laws relating to the Board of Works), Articles 424 to 436 - includes laws relating to Construction (ch. 1) and Dikes (ch. 2)

Five Punishments 
The five punishments in the code contained in Article 1 are: 

 The punishment of beating with the light bamboo. 
 The punishment of beating with the heavy bamboo
 Penal Servitude 
 The punishment of Exile 
 The penalty of Death.

Nature of the Code
A traditional Chinese legal system was largely in place during the Qing dynasty. The process of the amalgamation of a Confucian world-view and a legal code was considered complete by the Tang Code of AD 624. The code was regarded as a model of precision and clarity in terms of drafting and structure. Neo-Confucianism continued to be the state orthodoxy under the Song, Ming and Qing dynasties. Throughout the centuries, the Confucian foundations of the Tang Code were retained with even some aspects strengthened.

During the Qing dynasty, criminal justice was based on an extremely detailed criminal code. One element of the traditional Chinese criminal justice system is the notion that criminal law has a moral purpose, one of which is to get the convicted to repent and see the error of his ways. In the traditional Chinese legal system, a person could not be convicted of a crime unless they confessed. This often led to the use of torture, in order to extract the necessary confession. These elements still influence modern Chinese views toward law. All death sentences were reported to the capital and required the personal approval of the emperor.

There was no civil code separate from the criminal code, which led to the now discredited belief that traditional Chinese law had no civil law. More recent studies have demonstrated that most of the magistrates' legal work was in civil disputes, and that there was an elaborate system of civil law which used the Qing Code to establish torts. 

The Qing Code was in form exclusively a criminal code. Its statutes throughout stated as prohibitions and restrictions, and the violation of which was subjected to a range of punishments by a legalist state. In practice, however, large sections of the code and its sub-statutes dealt with matters that would properly be characterised as civil law. The populace made extensive use (perhaps a third of all cases) of the local magistrate courts to bring suits or threaten to sue on a whole range of civil disputes, characterized as "minor matters" in the Qing Code. Moreover, in practice, magistrates frequently tempered the application of the code by taking prevalent local custom into account in their decisions. Filed complaints were often settled among the parties before they received a formal court hearing, sometimes under the influence of probable action by the court.

Qing Code and the West
The Great Qing Legal Code was the first written Chinese work directly translated into English. The translation, known as Fundamental Laws of China was completed by English traveller Sir George Staunton in 1810. It was the first time the Qing code had been translated into a European language. The French translation was published in 1812.

The First and Second Opium Wars between the Qing dynasty and several Western powers led to the forced signing of several unequal treaties by the Chinese government, which granted subjects of the foreign nations in question extraterritoriality in China, which included being exempted from the Great Qing Legal Code. According to historian Ronald C. Po, foreign exemption from Chinese laws as a result of the unequal treaties "substantially challenged" Chinese control over its maritime border.

In the late Qing dynasty, there was a concerted effort to establish legal codes based on European models as a part of the Self-Strengthening Movement. Due to the German victory in the Franco-Prussian War and because Imperial Japan was used as the model for political and legal reform, the adopted legal code was modelled closely on that of Germany.

The end of the Qing Code and its remaining influence
In the early 20th century, with the advent of the "Constitutional Movement", the imperial government was forced by various pressures to quickly modernise its legal system. While the Qing Code remained law, it was qualified and supplemented in quick succession by the Outline of the Imperial Constitution of 1908 and the Nineteen Important Constitutional Covenants of 1911, as well as various specialist laws, such as the Great Qing Copyright Code in 1910.

In 1912, the collapse of Qing dynasty ended 268 years of its imperial rule over China and 2000 years of Chinese imperial history came to an end. The Qing court was replaced by the Republic of China government. While some parts of the Qing Code and other late Qing statutes were adopted for "temporary application" by the Beiyang Government of the Republic of China, as a general legal position the Qing Code ceased to have effect de jure due to the dissolution of the Qing state.

Republic of China
The newly founded Republic of China adopted the existing German-based legal codes, but these codes were not immediately put into practice. Following the overthrow of the Qing dynasty in 1912, China came under the control of rival warlords and had no government strong enough to establish a legal code to replace the Qing code. Finally in 1927, Chiang Kai-shek's Kuomintang government attempted to develop Western-style legal and penal systems. Few of the KMT codes, however, were implemented nationwide. Although government leaders were striving for a Western-inspired system of codified law, the traditional Chinese preference for collective social sanctions over impersonal legalism hindered constitutional and legal development. The spirit of the new laws never penetrated to the grass-roots level or provided hoped-for stability. Ideally, individuals were to be equal before the law, but this premise proved to be more rhetorical than substantive.

Law in the Republic of China on Taiwan today is based on the German-based legal system carried to Taiwan by the Kuomintang. The influence of the Qing Code manifests itself in the form of an exceptionally detailed penal code, with a large number of offences punishable by death. For example, in addition to the offence of piracy, there are also piracy causing grievous bodily harm (punishable by death or life imprisonment pursuant to Section 3 of Article 333 of the Criminal Code of the Republic of China (中華民國刑法)), as well as piracy causing death and piracy with arson, rape, kidnapping or murder (both entail mandatory death penalty pursuant to Section 3 of Article 333 and Article 334 of the Criminal Code). One legacy from those bygone era is the offence of murder of a family member (e.g. patricide and matricide). The offence entails life imprisonment or death pursuant to Section 1 of Article 272 of the Criminal Code, even for minors under 18 years old until abolition on July 1, 2006 of Section 2 of Article 63 of the Criminal Code that allowed for life imprisonment or the death penalty against minors committing crimes under Section 1 of Article 272.

People's Republic of China
In the People's Republic of China, while the legal system was, and to some extent still is, based on socialist law, it incorporates certain aspects of the Qing Code, most notably the notion that offenders should be shamed into repentance - in the form of the practice of parading condemned criminals in public from 1927 (the beginning of the Agrarian Revolutionary War) to 1988, when "the declaration of the Supreme People's Court, the Supreme People's Procuratorate and the Ministry of Public Security on resolutely stopping the street display of convicted and unconvicted criminals" was issued.

Hong Kong

In Hong Kong, after the establishment of British rule in 1841, the Great Qing Legal Code remained in force for the local Chinese population. Until the end of the 19th Century AD, Chinese offenders were still executed by decapitation, whereas British offenders would be put to death by hanging. Even deep into the 20th Century and well after the fall of the Qing dynasty in China, Chinese men in Hong Kong could still practice polygamy by virtue of the Qing Code—a situation that was ended only with the passing of the Marriage Reform Ordinance 1970 (Cap.178) which came into force on 7 October 1971. Therefore, the Great Qing Legal Code was actually enforced in some form for a total of 327 years, from 1644 AD to 1971 AD.

Because there are still living concubines married before the Marriage Reform Ordinance (Cap.178), and their rights (of inheritance, and the inheritance rights of their sons and daughters) are respected by the Hong Kong legal system (even after the 1997 handover), the Great Qing Legal Code is still admissible in evidence when handling legal cases relating to events that occurred before 1971.

See also
 Chinese law
 Traditional Chinese law
 Law of the People's Republic of China
 Law of Taiwan
 Five Punishments
 Ten Abominations

References

Notes

Further reading
Bodde, Derk, and Clarence Morris, eds. Law in Imperial China: Exemplified by 190 Ch'ing dynasty Cases. Cambridge, MA: Harvard University Press, 1967.
Jones, William C. The Great Qing Code: A New Translation, Oxford: Clarendon Press; New York: Oxford University Press, 1994.

External links 

 The Qing Code, Wallace Johnson, ed.
 
 

Legal codes
Legal history of China
Law in Qing dynasty
Law of Hong Kong